Dilauroyl peroxide is an organic compound with the formula (C11H23CO2)2.  A colorless solid, it is often sold as a water-damped solid. It is the symmetrical peroxide of lauric acid.  It is produced by treating lauroyl chloride with hydrogen peroxide in the presence of base:
2C11H23COCl  +  H2O2  +  2NaOH  →  (C11H23CO2)2  +  2HCl

References

Organic peroxides
Radical initiators